Nasinu is an urban area on the island Viti Levu in Fiji. It is officially designated a "Town" (and was formally incorporated as such in 1999) despite having a population larger than Suva City (92,043 at the 2017 Census). Nasinu is the most populous municipality in Fiji, having overtaken that of Suva (the capital), and is one of Fiji's fastest-growing towns. Its land area is the largest of any municipal area in Fiji, and more than twice that of Suva. It is a major residential hub in Fiji, housing a large majority of the work force in Nasinu itself and in the Fijian capital, Suva. The Nasinu property market has experienced significant growth over the last several years, leading to substantial increases in property value.

Nasinu Town
The Township of Nasinu is experiencing significant growth as a result of investments made by Indians who live in Fiji. The Town is located on Daniva Road and houses several companies, professional services and numerous shops. However, the lack of land in this area is stifling further development of Nasinu into a premier township of Fiji. It is also pushing commercial development to other areas within Nasinu and surrounding area. Some of the commercial complexes outside the main town area are as follows:

 Rups Mega Centre
 Vivrass Shopping Complex
 Vinod Patel Shopping Complex
 Hansons Shopping Complex
 Manohan Shopping Complex
 R B Patel Shopping Complex
Extra Shopping Complex 
Nayan Shopping Complex  
Newworld Shopping Complex  
Rajendra Shopping Complex  
Max value Shopping Complex  
ATLAS Shopping Complex  
Shop N Save Shopping Complex

Nasinu suburbs
Nasinu comprises the following suburbs: Laucala Beach Estate, Valelevu, Nadera, Nadawa, Caubati, Kinoya, Newtown, Nasole, Nepani, Tacirua New Sub, Tacirua old Sub, Makoi, Narere.

Laucala Beach Estate and Valelevu are the most developed and desirable of these suburbs and has seen significant growth in the property market. As a result, there has been an increase in house prices and rental three-fold over the last five years.

Health facilities
The Valelevu and Makoi Bhanabhai Health Centres are the primary health care facilities in the Nasinu area. Both are government run facilities.

Valelevu Health Centre is situated on the corner Daniva Road after the Valelevu Police Station. It has a population catchment of 50,187 (2010 Figures) through seven zones (Nadera & Nadawa) [largest population]; Kinoya or Laucala Beach [LBE], Caubati [largest geographically], Newtown, Tacirua (Dokanaisuva), Kalabu, Services offered are: General Outpatient Services; Special Outpatient Services; Emergency Services; Family Planning; Maternal Child Health; Services; Dental Services; Pharmacy Services; and Zone Nursing.

Makoi Bhanabhai Health Centre is situated on Matainikorovatu Road behind Hanson's Supermarket. It has a population catchment of 24, 902 (2010 Figures) Services offered are: General Outpatient Services; Special Outpatient Services; Emergency Services; Family Planning; Maternal Child Health; Services; Dental Services; Pharmacy Services; and Zone Nursing.

Places of interest in Nasinu
 Fiji National University (FNU)- main Campus
 Land Transport Authority headquarters
 Housing Authority of Fiji headquarters
 Fiji Military Forces Officer Training Camp (Amy Training Group)
 Nasinu Juvenile Prison – Fiji's only juvenile corrections center
 Kinoya Sewerage Plant – Fiji's largest urban sewerage treatment plant
 Water Authority of Fiji headquarters
 Suva-Nausori corridor, Fiji's largest urban population centre linking the capital Suva with Nausori town
 Rups Mega Centre, one of Fiji's largest commercial shopping centres

References

Naitasiri Province
Populated places in Fiji